Joe Conroy (born July 24, 1934) is a Democratic former member of both houses of the Michigan Legislature, representing parts of Genesee County for two decades.

Prior to his election to the House, Conroy was active in real estate and building in the Flint area. He was also a member of the city's charter review commission and the county board of commissioners. He was elected to the Michigan House of Representatives in 1976 and served three terms. He sought and won election to the Michigan Senate in 1982 and served there for four terms. While in the Senate, he served on the Appropriations Committee.

Conroy was governmental operations director under former Mayor Don Williamson of Flint for four and a half years, resigning in 2008.

References

Members of the Michigan House of Representatives
Michigan state senators
1934 births
Living people
20th-century American politicians